The flag of the Moldavian Soviet Socialist Republic was adopted on 31 January 1952. The flag has three horizontal bands of red, green (1/4) and red, with a hammer and sickle in the canton. As defined by the Presidium of the Supreme Soviet of the Moldavian Soviet Socialist Republic on the flag description:

History

Moldavian ASSR

Between 1924 and 1940, part of Moldova was organized as the Moldavian ASSR within the Ukrainian SSR. A red flag, with the gold hammer and sickle in the top-left corner, above the Cyrillic characters УРСР (Ukrainian initials of Ukrainian SSR) and the Latin characters RSSU (Moldovan initials of Ukrainian SSR in Latin script) was adopted in 1938. The Moldovan text on the flag was later changed to PCCУ (Moldovan initials of Ukrainian SSR in Cyrillic script).

Moldavian SSR

In 1940, a red flag with the gold hammer and sickle in the top-left corner, with the Cyrillic characters РССМ (Moldovan initials of Moldavian SSR in Cyrillic script) above them in gold in a serif font was adopted for the newly founded Moldavian Soviet Socialist Republic.

With perestroika in force, the Moldovan nationalism came in place with the Popular Front of Moldova being involved. On 27 April 1990, the new flag of the Moldavian SSR consisted of the Romanian tricolor with the emblem of the Moldavian SSR in the centre. However, it was decided to use the flag without the emblem until new symbols were worked on. When Moldavia declared sovereignty in June 1990, the new flag was adopted on 6 November 1990 and remains the flag of Moldova to this day.

Use in Transnistria
The 1952 flag is readopted as the flag of Transnistria, a breakaway region which is recognised as Moldova's territory by the United Nations.

See also
 Coat of arms of the Moldavian SSR
 Flag of Moldova
 Flag of Transnistria
 Flag of the Socialist Republic of Romania

References

External links
Flag of Moldavian SSR at www.crwflags.com (1)
Flag of Moldavian SSR at www.crwflags.com (2)
Flag of Moldavian SSR at www.vexillographia.ru (in Russian)

Moldavian Soviet Socialist Republic
Moldavian Soviet Socialist Republic
1952 establishments in the Moldavian Soviet Socialist Republic
Moldavian
1990 disestablishments in the Moldavian Soviet Socialist Republic